Yvette Nipar (born 1964) is an American actress best known for such films and television series as 21 Jump Street, RoboCop: The Series, CSI: Miami, CSI: Crime Scene Investigation and Ski Patrol. She is the ex-wife of Patrick McDermott.

Career
Yvette was born in Los Angeles, California. She began modeling shortly after graduating from Huntington Beach High School, then started doing commercials. She acted in many television series from 1986 to 2006. In 2007, she retired after appearing in Walking Tall: Lone Justice as Agent Kate Jensen.

Personal life 
She married Patrick McDermott in March 1992. They divorced in June 1993.

Filmography

Movies

Television

References

External links
 

American film actresses
American television actresses
Living people
Actresses from Los Angeles
1964 births
21st-century American women